Kim Yong-hee is a South Korean labor rights activist and protester. He was employed at Samsung Aerospace from 1982 to 1995, when he was dismissed for attempting to organize a labor union. Kim had also claimed that Samsung had filed defamation lawsuits against him, alongside claims of sexual assault and accusations of spying.

Kim began a series of sit-ins and hunger strikes after his firing in 1995, largely focused on Samsung. Since June 2019, he has been living atop a  traffic camera tower overlooking an intersection in Seoul while protesting Samsung activities. His platform on the tower includes a sleeping bag, placards, a megaphone, and necessary supplies that are replenished by rope. Samsung Electronics vice chairman Lee Jae-yong announced in May 2020 that the company would end its policy of suppressing the creation of labor unions.

References

Korean trade unionists
Living people
Year of birth missing (living people)